Henry Byrne was a barrister who served as a Puisne Justice of the Supreme Court of Ceylon.

References

Puisne Justices of the Supreme Court of Ceylon
British expatriates in Sri Lanka
19th-century British people
British Ceylon judges